The Olten–Bern railway line is one of the major railway lines of Switzerland, running between the major rail hub of Olten—where lines from Zurich, Basel, Bern, Lucerne and Neuchâtel come together—and the Swiss capital of Bern. Together with the Lausanne–Bern railway, it forms the Mittellandlinie ("midland line"), which connects Olten with Lausanne. The first part of the line was opened in 1856 and the original line was completed on 4 September 1858. The line was built by the Swiss Central Railway, which was taken over by the Swiss Federal Railways on its establishment in 1902.

Several important upgrades have been implemented on this line since 1981. The Born line was opened in 1981 to bypass a congested section of line around Aarburg Oftringen station and the longer Grauholz line, including the  tunnel Grauholz Tunnel, was opened in 1995. This was extended on 12 December 2004, when the first major high-speed Mattstetten–Rothrist line was opened, although it is limited to 200 km/h.  This line is notable for having the heaviest traffic operating under the European Train Control System so far.

History
Since the railway bridge over the Aare river not yet built, a temporary station was established at Wylerfeld and for over a year, travellers were taken by coach from Wylerfeld to the city. Also a pedestrian link was opened at that time via the Altenbergsteg bridge below the site of the Kornhaus road bridge (which was completed in 1898). Finally, on 15 November 1858, the Aare Bridge (known as the Rote Brücke, German for "red bridge") because of its red lead rust-proof paint) was completed and the first train crossed the bridge and ran into Bern. Since the station building was still under construction, a temporary train shed was built. On 1 May 1860, the permanent Bern station was opened.

Born line
The Born line, named after Born mountain, which it passes, was opened on 2 April 1981, to bypass the Aarburg Oftringen station, connecting Olten station directly with Rothrist station. It is now the access route to the Mattstetten–Rothrist new line.

The line from Olten to Aarburg-Oftringen was limited to 40 km/h and therefore was an obstacle to the operation of express trains between Bern and Zurich. This line also had to absorb all trains to Bern and Lucerne on two tracks and had therefore reached capacity. Therefore, the SBB began the construction of a new line between Olten and Rothrist, coinciding with the modernization of Olten station. Construction started in 1976 and scheduled operations on the line began on 31 May 1981.

In addition, together with the modernization of Olten station, it significantly increased the capacity of the lines from Olten to Bern and Lucerne.

Grauholz line and tunnel
It starts with a grade-separated branch at Löchligut and then enters the Grauholz Tunnel. At the other end, from 1995–2004 it rejoined the trunk line Bern-Olten line at Mattstetten. Since 2004 there is a grade-separated branch at Äspli, which runs straight on to the Mattstetten–Rothrist new line. For its entire length the tunnel runs on an "s"-shaped curve underneath the wooded Grauholz hill where the Bernese were defeated by French troops at the Battle of Grauholz on 5 March 1798.

Mattstetten–Rothrist new line

On 12 December 2004, a new high-speed rail line was opened between Mattstetten and Rothrist  as part of the comprehensive Rail 2000 project. The line has a maximum speed of 200 kilometers per hour and reduced the travel time between major Swiss hubs of Bern, Basel and Zurich to under an hour allowing the regular interval timetable (German: Taktfahrplan) to be put into effect, where both express and stopping trains on all lines arrive and leave on the hour at Bern and Zurich stations, allowing a great number of convenient connections. The line was the longest new line built in Switzerland since 1926. Construction began in April 1996 and was planned to be completed date in 2005. On 30 April 2004, the last piece of rail was put into place at the Bern-Solothurn canton border at Inkwil on the connection to Solothurn.

Notes

References
 

Railway lines in Switzerland
Railway lines opened in 1856
1856 establishments in Switzerland
Swiss Federal Railways lines
15 kV AC railway electrification